Caprice Carthans, a trans woman of color and resident of Marquette Park (Chicago), was a co-chair of the Intergraded Community Advisory Board (CAB) at the AIDS Foundation of Chicago (AFC) and is an inductee of the Chicago LGBT Hall of Fame in 2020. 

Carthans, as of August 2022, is a member of the AFC Board of Directors and CAB.

Biography

Transgender
When she was eleven, Carthans came out as trans to her mother, whom she found very supportive.

HIV
She grew restless while studying at Chicago State University so sje moved to New York City where she lived for about thirty years. It was there, in 1999, that sje was diagnosed with HIV. When she was unable to afford living in NYC any longer, she returned to the place she considered home which is Chicago and got case management services from  Christian Community Health Center (CCHC).

Career
Her time at CCHC inspired her to give back and at Heartland Alliance, she worked as an Affordable Care Act healthcare navigator helping trans women and sex workers sign up for health care.

Honors and awards
Her awards include the 2017 National Transgender Testing Day Advocate and was the Chicago Department of Public Health HIV Trailblazer. She was featured in the 2018 book by Kehrer Verlag  called To Survive on this Shore.

In 2019, she was one of two honored on the Transgender Day of Remembrance.

References

Living people
Year of birth missing (living people)
Transgender women

Chicago State University alumni
People with HIV/AIDS
Inductees of the Chicago LGBT Hall of Fame
American LGBT rights activists